= 1921–22 Maccabi Tel Aviv F.C. season =

Maccabi Tel Aviv
1921–22 season

The 1921–22 season was Maccabi Tel Aviv's 16th season since its establishment in 1906. As the local football association wasn't founded until July 1928, there were no officially organized competitions during the season, and the club played only friendly matches.

== Overview ==
As no governing body existed at the time, and with limited possibilities for travel, the football sections of the Jerusalem and Tel Aviv societies played matches, mostly against teams of British soldiers stationed in the vicinity. Several matches were reported as they were to be played, but no result was given for the match afterwards, and it is not known if the matches were played.

== Known Matches ==
Date	Opponent	Venue	Result	Scorers
31 December 1921	H.E.I. (British Army)	Select Ground	1–3	
4 February 1922	Jerusalem Sports Club	Rec. Ground	4–2	
